Herbal Blend is a DJ mix album, mixed by The Herbaliser, released on 22 September 2003 as part of the Solid Steel mix series.

Track listing 
"Herbal Blend Intro"
"Laying The Trap" - Charles Bernstein / Verbal Anime (Acapella featuring Rakaa-Iriscience) - The Herbaliser
"The Broken Clock" - Cherrystones / Riddim Killa - Rodney P
"Exotica" - Harmonic 33
"Las Chicas" (The Herbaliser Remix) - The Easy Access Orchestra  / Analyze (Acapella featuring Mr. Len) - Mass Influence
"Gangster Boogie" - Chicago Gangsters
"Uzi" (Pinky Ring) (Instrumental) - Wu-Tang Clan / It Ain't Nothin' (Acapella featuring MF Doom) - The Herbaliser
"Fuck The Police" (Instrumental)  - Jay Dee / Sucker M.C.'s (Instrumental) - Run DMC
"The Number Song" (Cut Chemist Party mix) - DJ Shadow
"Tea & Beer" (Freestyle) (featuring Jean Grae) - The Herbaliser
"Pushin' On" - The Quantic Soul Orchestra
"Slick Cat" - Carol Kaye
"It's Up To You" - Steinski & Mass Media
"Time To Build" (P Brothers remix) - The Herbaliser
"Juice Crew Law" - MC Shan
"Mella" (The Herbaliser Drive Faster mix) - DJ Food
"Stars And Rockets" - Peter Thomas Sound Orchestra
"The Chase" - James William Guercio
"Groove Is In The Heart" (Jelly Jam Beats) - Deee-Lite
"Snake Bite" (The Herbaliser remix) - Fourth World
"Tilt" - Arcade Funk
"World Destruction" (featuring John Lydon) - Time Zone / The Missing Suitcase - The Herbaliser

References

DJ mix albums
2003 compilation albums
Ninja Tune compilation albums